Unity Day of Yemen (also called National Unity Day, National Day, Republic Day) is national holiday in Yemen held on May 22. It commemorates the unification of North Yemen and South Yemen, which took place on this date in 1990.

On this day, the president makes a speech broadcast on television and radio, and awards state decorations and orders to Yemeni citizens.

See also
Southern Movement

External links

References

Yemeni culture
Society of Yemen
May observances
Yemen